Chiaravalle Centrale is a  and town in the province of Catanzaro in the Calabria region of southern Italy.

Based on the first historical legends, Chiaravalle Centrale dates back to the domination of the Normans and the subsequent occupation, around the year 1075, by Roger I and his successor Roger II, around the year 1130.

References

Cities and towns in Calabria